Live! In Tune and on Time is a live album by American hip hop producer DJ Shadow, released on June 15, 2004 by DJ Shadow. Recorded in 2002 at Brixton Academy in London, it features tracks and samples from past albums as well as his work with UNKLE and Quannum. The album was released on double vinyl LP and as a CD/DVD set, and the DVD contains additional tracks and material.

The title refers to DJ Shadow's observation that his live shows "only really got interesting when the songs were not only on time but in tune as well."

Track listings

CD
 Intro
 Fixed Income
 What Does Your Soul Look Like (Part 2)
 In/Flux
 Un Autre Introduction
 Walkie Talkie
 Guns Blazing (Drums of Death Part 1)
 Lonely Soul
 Lost & Found
 What Does Your Soul Look Like (Part 3)
 Mutual Slump
 Stem/Long Stem
 Reconstruction Medley
 Holy Calamity (Bear Witness II)
 The Third Decade, Our Move
 Halfway Home
 The Number Song
 Organ Donor
 Mashin' on the Motorway
 Blood on the Motorway
 Napalm Brain/Scatter Brain & Outro

DVD
Intro
 Act I
 Fixed Income
 What Does Your Soul Look Like (Part 2)
 In/Flux
 Un Autre Introduction
 Walkie Talkie
Act 2
 Guns Blazing (Drums of Death Part 1)
 Lonely Soul
 Lost & Found
 What Does Your Soul Look Like (Part 3)
 Mutual Slump
 Stem/Long Stem
 Act 3
 Reconstruction Medley
 Holy Calamity (Bear Witness II)
 The Third Decade, Our Move
 Halfway Home
 The Number Song
 Organ Donor
 Intermission
 Act 4
 Six Days
 Mashin' on the Motorway
 Blood on the Motorway
 Act 5
 Napalm Brain/Scatter Brain & Outro
 Encore
 You Can't Go Home Again
 Midnight in a Perfect World
 High Noon
 Special Features
 Malcolm on Drums
 Pushin' Buttons

See also
 Harmonic mixing
 Beatmatching

References

DJ Shadow albums
2004 live albums
2004 video albums
Live video albums